Ordem dos Avogados (Portuguese for: Order of the Attorneys), refers to the bar associations of several Portuguese speaking countries, namely:
Ordem dos Advogados de Angola, the bar association of Angola
Ordem dos Advogados do Brasil, the bar association of Brazil
Ordem dos Advogados de Cabo Verde, the bar association of Cape Verde
Ordem dos Advogados da Guiné-Bissau, the bar Association of Guinea-Bissau
Ordem dos Advogados de Moçambique, the bar Association of Mozambique
Ordem dos Advogados Portugueses, the bar association of Portugal
Ordem dos Advogados de São Tomé e Príncipe, the bar Association of São Tomé and Príncipe